Events from the year 1621 in Ireland.

Incumbent
Monarch: James I

Events
 King James I of England claims royal inheritance of the whole of Upper Ossory in County Laois including the manor of Offerlane from the de Clare family at an inquisition held at Portlaoise. The king institutes a plantation of the area in 1626.
 October 12: battle of starlings: two flocks of the birds gathered over the city of Cork and prepared for war like two trained armies before violently clashing. The attacks continued all day before a two-day recess until the fighting resumed. The fierce battle left the city deluged by broken wings and dead birds.

Births

 Charles O'Kelly—Soldier and writer who fought in the Williamite War in Ireland and wrote the only account of the battle of Aughrim by an area native.

Deaths

References

 Galway Authors, Helen Mahar, 1976

1620s in Ireland
Years of the 17th century in Ireland